Who Wants to Be a Millionaire? is a Ugandan game show based on the original British format of Who Wants to Be a Millionaire?. The show is hosted by Alan Kasujja. The main goal of the game is to win USh 25 million (about US$10,000) by answering 15 multiple-choice questions correctly. The show is broadcast from January 31, 2011 to 2012. It was shown on the private TV station NTV Uganda.

Money tree

References

External links
Official website

Who Wants to Be a Millionaire?
2011 Ugandan television series debuts
2010s Ugandan television series
NTV Uganda original programming